Cyrus Townsend Brady (December 20, 1861 – January 24, 1920) was a journalist, historian and adventure writer. His best-known work is Indian Fights and Fighters.

Background
He was born in Allegheny, Pennsylvania, and graduated from the U.S. Naval Academy in 1883. In 1889, he was ordained a deacon in the Episcopal church, and was ordained a priest in 1890. His first wife was Clarissa Guthrie, who died in 1890. His second wife was Mary Barrett.

Brady's first major book, For Love of Country, whilst telling the story of a fictitious John Seymour, was actually based in part on the true heroics of Nicholas Biddle, one of the first five captains of the fledgling Continental Navy.

Brady was also famous for his views of feminism and Women's suffrage, he preached many anti-suffrage sermons and described women voters as "an insult to God".

In 1914 ,Brady began working as a screenwriter at Vitagraph Company of America.

Brady died in Yonkers, New York of pneumonia at age 58.

Works 
The Island of Regeneration (1888)
For Love of Country (1898)
American Fights and Fighters (1900)
Recollections of a Missionary in the Great West (1900)
Hohenzollern: A Story of the Time of Frederick Barbarossa (1901)
The Southerners (1903)
A Little Traitor to the South (1904)
A Midshipman in the Pacific (1904)
Indian Fights and Fighters (1904)
The Corner in Coffee (1904)
Three Daughters of the Confederacy (1905)
The Patriots (1906)
Northwestern Fights and Fighters (1907)
As the Sparks Fly Upward (1911)
Bob Dashaway Privateersman (1911)
Hearts and the Highway (1911)
Secret Service (1912)
The Island of the Stairs (1913)
Britton of the Seventh: A Romance of Custer and the Great Northwest A.C. McClurg & Co. Chicago (1914)
And Thus He Came: A Christmas Fantasy (New York and London: G. P. Putnam's Sons, 1916
By the World Forgot (1917)
Little France

Many more titles by Cyrus Townsend Brady are listed in:  American Fiction, 1901–1925: A Bibliography by Geoffrey D. Smith, pp. 75–78.

References

External links

 
 
 
 Portrait of Cyrus Townsend Brady with Autograph
 

1861 births
1920 deaths
19th-century American novelists
20th-century American novelists
20th-century American male writers
19th-century American historians
Writers from Pittsburgh
American male novelists
American male short story writers
19th-century American short story writers
20th-century American short story writers
19th-century American male writers
Novelists from Pennsylvania
Deaths from pneumonia in New York (state)
20th-century American essayists
American male non-fiction writers
Historians from Pennsylvania